Sébastien Crétinoir (born 12 February 1986 in Fort-de-France, Martinique) is a professional footballer who plays as a defender for Golden Lion in the Martinique Championnat National and internationally for Martinique.

He made his debut for Martinique in 2010. He was in the Martinique Gold Cup squads for the 2013 and 2017  tournaments.

Career statistics
Scores and results list Martinique's goal tally first, score column indicates score after each Crétinoir goal.

References

1986 births
Living people
Martiniquais footballers
Martinique international footballers
Golden Lion FC players
Association football defenders
Sportspeople from Fort-de-France
2013 CONCACAF Gold Cup players
2017 CONCACAF Gold Cup players
2019 CONCACAF Gold Cup players
2021 CONCACAF Gold Cup players